Loxocera cylindrica is a species of rust flies in the family Psilidae.

References

Further reading

External links

 Diptera.info

Psilidae
Diptera of North America
Insects described in 1823